In the 2010–11 season, Persija Jakarta played in the Indonesian Super League and Piala Indonesia.

Season overview
In this season, Persija  successfully end the competition in third place Indonesian Super League. Teams are coached by Rahmad Darmawan is only on goal difference from the second place, Arema Indonesia. Persija also beat back-to-back Persib Bandung.

Club

Coaching Staff

Squad

(vice-captain)

(captain)

Out on loan

(at Bontang FC)

Transfers

In

Out

Competitions

Classification

Matches

Indonesia Super League

See also
 2010–11 Indonesia Super League

References
http://www.detiksport.com/sepakbola/index.php/detik.schedulep/idkanal/76
https://web.archive.org/web/20101101172201/http://www.liga-indonesia.co.id/bli/index.php?go=news.matchfull&divisi=19

Persija Jakarta seasons
Persija Jakarta